The 638th Aviation Support Battalion (638th ASB) is a US Army National Guard battalion. The unit earned the Meritorious Unit Commendation for the period 1 May 2019 to 8 January 2020.

References

AVN 638